Wheaton Academy (WA) is a private, Christian, co-educational high school in West Chicago, Illinois, which was established as part of the Illinois Institute by a group of evangelical abolitionists in 1853. The Illinois Institute was reorganized into Wheaton College and Wheaton College Academy, a preparatory school, in 1860. Wheaton Academy established an independent campus in West Chicago in 1945.

Academics 

WA is a member of the Association of Christian Schools International, recognized by the state of Illinois and the DuPage County Education Service Region. The school was awarded a National Blue Ribbon from the U.S. Department of Education in 2019.

Academic facilities 

Wheaton Academy has 3 buildings used for academics. The Academic Building (main building) hosts a variety of classes, including math, science, languages, and English, along with several non-traditional classes. Academy Hall has history classes taught in its historic building and is used as storage space. The fine arts facilities include a multipurpose performance hall, a visual arts room, and a ceramics studio. Students can access a maker space called the “Idea Lab” with woodworking equipment, laser cutter machines, and 3d printers.

Curriculum Highlights 

 Offers in total 183 classes (2022)
 Advanced Placement classes: 25
 Advanced classes: 29
 All students receive Surface Pro's
 Offers specialized courses, internships, and trips outside of the US as a part of Wheaton Academy's Winterim
 Languages taught: French, Chinese, Spanish, Latin (online)

The MASTER Program 
"MASTER stands for Mathematics, Applied Science, Technology, Engineering, and Research. Every student at Wheaton Academy participates in the MASTER Program by taking math and science classes throughout high school. In addition to the core math and science classes, the MASTER program also provides students with cutting-edge STEM opportunities in robotics, technology, engineering, and laboratory research. "In doing so, we hope to train leaders with the skills and wisdom to serve as God’s people in some of the most exciting and innovative fields in the world today."

Academy by Design Cohort 
"Academy by Design is a four-year program that empowers students to purposefully engage with challenges that matter to them and their communities.  Freshman year doesn’t look that different from what students at Wheaton Academy have done in the past, but by senior year, students have immense freedom to shape their schedule around internships, online and alternative courses, collaborative projects, and deep immersion in specific fields of interest.  And, throughout those four years, students in Academy by Design take courses that teach them to think like designers, collaborate like professionals, and understand the needs of those around them."

Business and Innovation Program 
"Teachers and volunteers at Wheaton Academy are committed to preparing students to be versatile, forward-thinking producers and consumers in a rapidly changing global economy. The Business & Innovation Program is an optional path students may take to better equip themselves to take the lead in today’s competitive marketplace by developing core business knowledge and skills with a Christian mindset." "After learning business innovation principles and touring some businesses, entrepreneurial students developed a business plan for a Wheaton Academy food trailer called “The Shack”. What started out as a concept, and after working through the challenges posed to the students, they now have the opportunity to put their business plan into market with a real business operating out of a food trailer."

Athletics 

The "Warriors" compete in baseball, boys' basketball, girls' basketball, boys' cross country, girls' cross country, football, boys' golf, girls' golf,  boys' lacrosse, boys' soccer, girls' soccer, softball, boys' tennis, girls' tennis, girls' volleyball, boys' volleyball, and wrestling as members of the Metro Suburban Conference of the Illinois High School Association. They also offer boys and girls swimming and sideline cheering.

State titles 

† Tie

Athletic facilities 

The school's athletic facilities include Heritage Fieldhouse with four basketball courts, Performance Trust Field for football, soccer, and lacrosse, one baseball and one softball diamond, seven tennis courts, and a weight room.

Co-Curricular Highlights 

 71 Co-Curriculars offered
 Project Lead
 5 students received a $3,000 investment to start up their business idea called "Hugbands" during a Shark Tank-like simulation 
 Boys soccer wins IHSA State Championship (2014, 2021)
 Wheaton Academy Quiz Bowl wins Regionals (2021)
 Boys golf wins IHSA State Championship (2009)
 Girls soccer wins IHSA State Championship (2004, 2009, 2016)
 Video production team wins Crystal Pillar Award (2022)
 Kingdom Community
 Community Service

Service Project Club 
Olivia Smith ’22  approached teacher Eric Bowling about starting a service project club, an idea that had been on Bowling’s heart for some time. She was an answer to Eric Bowling’s prayers for God to send students to him with servant's hearts. Olivia’s vision for creating a club dedicated to service projects was prompted by an Academy student book drive conducted during the spring ’20 COVID-19 quarantine. WA students, champing at the bit to do something, to make a difference somewhere, organized and collected 2000 books which they donated to a local book rescue, visited members at Windsor Park Retirement Community, wrote cards of encouragement to hospital kids, and raked leaves for local elderly.

Project IX 
"The purpose of this team is to build relationships with the freshmen class. As a part of Project IX, students will lead a small group of freshmen to teach them Wheaton Academy school culture and to guide them as they transition into high school."

Project Chapel 
"The purpose of this team is to lead our school in the area of large group spiritual formation through our weekly chapel program, worship nights, and spiritual life week."

Project Discipleship 
"The purpose of this team is to provide our student body with discipleship opportunities beyond the structure of weekly chapels by creating and leading bible studies, prayer opportunities, and other forms of discipleship."

Project Local 
"The purpose of this team is to serve our communities. As a part of Project LEAD Local, students will be in charge of our partnership with Puente del Pueblo. In addition, this team will also educate our student body regarding issues faced by local communities and how we can respond to them."

Project Fellowship of Christian Athletes (FCA) 
"The purpose of this team is to mentor young athletes through our Huddle program at Wheaton Christian Grammar School. This team will also look to partner with other FCA teams and programs."

Project Global 
"The purpose of this team is to lead our student body in the context of global ministry. As a part of Project LEAD Global, students will be put in charge of our partnership with Kids Alive. In addition, this team will also educate our student body regarding global issues and how we can respond to them."

Student Life 

 Annual glow dance on the first football game
 Homecoming week and homecoming dance
 Annual fight song competition during homecoming week
 Soiree 
 Sock Hop
 Prom
 Mr. WA
 Kairos show
 Senior trip
 Freshman retreat (Freshman Launch)
 Sophomore retreat

Notable alumni

Business 
 Robert Van Kampen, class of 1960, businessman and founder of Van Kampen Investments
 Wess Stafford, class of 1967, chief executive, activist, and author

Christian ministry 
 Jon M. Sweeney, class of 1985, writer
 Robert Kenneth Strachan, missionary

Politics and culture 
 Randy Hultgren, class of 1984, congressman
 Todd Beamer, class of 1985, passenger on United Airlines Flight 93 during the September 11 attacks

Sports 
 Bruno Peterson, class of 1997, Latvia men's national basketball team
 Christian Fischer, class of 2013, NHL player
 Crystal Thomas, class of 2012, NWSL player
 Grant Stoneman, class of 2014, USL player
 Jake Cousins, class of 2013, MLB player
 Leah Fortune, class of 2009, Brazil women's national football team
 Ryan Dzingel, class of 2010, NHL player

External links

References 

West Chicago, Illinois
Schools in DuPage County, Illinois
Private high schools in Illinois
Christian schools in Illinois
Nondenominational Christian schools in the United States
1853 establishments in Illinois
Educational institutions established in 1853